Kidsgrove is a civil parish in the district of Newcastle-under-Lyme, Staffordshire, England.  The parish contains 29 listed buildings that are recorded in the National Heritage List for England.  All the listed buildings are designated at Grade II, the lowest of the three grades, which is applied to "buildings of national importance and special interest".  The parish contains the town of Kidsgrove, The villages of Talke and Newchapel, and part of the village of Mow Cop.  The Trent and Mersey Canal passes through the parish, and the listed buildings associated with it are bridges, tunnel portals, and a milepost.  Also listed are three tunnel portals built by the North Staffordshire Railway.  The other listed buildings include a village cross with a medieval base, houses and cottages, farmhouses and farm buildings, churches, a vicarage, a chapel with a manse, a memorial in a churchyard, a folly, a tower, and a war memorial.


Buildings

References

Citations

Sources

Lists of listed buildings in Staffordshire
Borough of Newcastle-under-Lyme